Neoterebra pedroana, common name the San Pedro auger, is a species of sea snail, a marine gastropod mollusk in the family Terebridae, the auger snails.

The subspecies Terebra pedroana hemphilli Vanatta, 1924 has become a synonym of Neoterebra hemphilli (Vanatta, 1924)

Description
The size of an adult shell varies between 40 mm and 61 mm.

Distribution
This marine species occurs from Santa Monica, California to  Southern Baja California, Mexico

References

 Terryn Y. (2007). Terebridae: A Collectors Guide. Conchbooks & NaturalArt. 59pp + plates

External links
 Gastropods.com : Terebra (Variegata-group) pedroana; accessed : 5 May 2011
 Fedosov, A. E.; Malcolm, G.; Terryn, Y.; Gorson, J.; Modica, M. V.; Holford, M.; Puillandre, N. (2020). Phylogenetic classification of the family Terebridae (Neogastropoda: Conoidea). Journal of Molluscan Studies

Terebridae
Gastropods described in 1908